Red Dirt may refer to:

Soils
 Red soil
 Ultisol, or red clay soil
 Latosol, or tropical red earth

Arts and entertainment
 Red dirt (music), a music genre
 Red Dirt (film), a 2000 American film 
 "Red Dirt" (Fear the Walking Dead), a television episode
 Red Dirt: Growing up Okie, a 1997 book by Roxanne Dunbar-Ortiz

See also